Kenneth Ouriel (born October 21, 1956) is a vascular surgeon and medical researcher. He has published in scientific and medical journals. He treated former presidential candidate Bob Dole for an abdominal aortic aneurysm in 2001. In the middle 2000s, Ouriel went to Dubai as CEO to help build a world-class hospital; he treated several Middle Eastern rulers in addition to his administrative duties. In 2009, he was senior vice president and chief of international operations at NewYork-Presbyterian Hospital. He has been described as one of America's top vascular surgeons.

Career
Ouriel was born in Rochester, New York, entered college at age 16, majored in biology and psychology at the University of Rochester and belonged to the fraternity Alpha Delta Phi. He was elected to Phi Beta Kappa in 1976 and graduated summa cum laude in 1977. He studied medicine at the University of Chicago and graduated in 1981 with Honors. He began a residency in general surgery at the University of Rochester Medical Center and completed a vascular surgical fellowship in 1987. He got a National Institutes of Health grant to study thrombosis and published results from a large, multicenter randomized trial of clot busting therapy in The New England Journal of Medicine in 1998. In 1998, he was recruited to the Cleveland Clinic as the chief of Vascular Surgery.  He was promoted to Chief of Surgery in 2003 where he supervised 340 surgeons in the largest surgical department in the world. He authored three textbooks in vascular surgery and over 250 original scientific articles on a wide variety of vascular surgical topics, focusing on minimally invasive means to treat vascular disease.

In 2001, he treated former presidential candidate Bob Dole who, at age 77, had an abdominal aortic aneurysm; Ouriel led a team of surgeons that inserted a stent graft. "Ouriel said that the team inserted a Y-shaped tube through an incision in Dole's leg and placed it inside the weakened portion of the aorta. The aneurysm will eventually contract around the stent, which will remain in place for the rest of Dole's life," wrote a reporter. Ouriel was the principal investigator on a five-year $5 million National Institutes of Health grant to study intravascular ultrasound regarding atherosclerotic plaque.

Ouriel led a team from the Cleveland Clinic to Abu Dhabi in 2007 to manage an existing hospital, the Sheikh Khalifa Medical Center, and to build a world class hospital called the Cleveland Clinic Abu Dhabi which is scheduled to open in 2013. In that connection, Ouriel matriculated in an Executive MBA program in global business jointly run by Columbia Business School and the London Business School. Ouriel worked on upgrade systems involving the future hospital's financial, decision-support management, inventory control and medical productivity software. Ouriel was the CEO of the Sheikh Khalifa Medical City. Ouriel treated Middle Eastern rulers including Sheikh Zayed of Abu Dhabi in 2000, Sheikh Maktoum of Dubai in 2004, and the former Emir of Kuwait, Sheikh Sabah in 2005. Ouriel, as part of the UAE health authority, met with visiting dignitaries, including First Lady Laura Bush. Ouriel completed his master's degree in business administration from Columbia and London Business Schools. While heading the Sheikh Khalifa Medical City in Abu Dhabi in the United Arab Emirates, Ouriel initiated a controversial move to disclose hospital data online which would allow people to get a "snapshot of the facility's clinical strengths and weaknesses"; he favors transparency.

Ouriel facilitated the development of the first permanent renal transplantation program in the United Arab Emirates, where the Sheikh Khalifa team performed their first kidney transplant in early 2008. He is quoted in newspapers regarding medical subjects. In June 2008, Ouriel became senior vice president and chief of international operations at New York-Presbyterian. In 2009, Ouriel made speeches to medical professionals about such topics as retaining patients and public-private partnerships.

In 2010, Ouriel founded Syntactx, a contract research organization that assists medical device, pharmaceutical, and diagnostic laboratory companies with the design and execution of clinical research trials. Ranked #241 on the 2015 Inc. 500 list of the fastest-growing private companies in America, Syntactx is headquartered in New York City and has offices in Belgium, and it partners with firms across the United States and in Europe.

Publications
 1995, textbook, Lower Extremity Vascular Disease
 1998, textbook, Mastery of Vascular and Endovascular Surgery
 2005, textbook, Complications In Endovascular Therapy

References

External links
 Syntactx, firm founded by Ouriel in 2010

Living people
Alumni of London Business School
American medical researchers
American vascular surgeons
Columbia Business School alumni
American health care chief executives
People from Rochester, New York
Pritzker School of Medicine alumni
University of Rochester alumni
1956 births
Scientists from New York (state)